Oleksandr Anatoliyovych Likhvald (born September 9, 1978) is a retired male weightlifter from Ukraine. He competed for his native country at the 2000 Summer Olympics in the men's bantamweight division (– 56 kg), finishing in 9th place in the final standings. He competed at world championships, most recently at the 2003 World Weightlifting Championships.

Major results

References

External links

1978 births
Living people
Ukrainian male weightlifters
Olympic weightlifters of Ukraine
Weightlifters at the 2000 Summer Olympics
Place of birth missing (living people)
20th-century Ukrainian people
21st-century Ukrainian people